La Guaira Bank, is a large, completely submerged bank in Venezuela. It is located in the Caribbean Sea 20 km to the NNE off the northern shore of La Guaira.

This reef has an excellent reputation for deep-sea angling. Currents create an upwelling of nutrients that attracts large pelagic fish such as sailfish, marlin, yellowfin tuna and mahi-mahi.

Geography
The La Guaira Bank is a Pleistocene structure that is wholly submerged. It is 19 km long and 6 km wide. Its depths range between 60 and 70 m, rising from the 260 m deep surrounding seabed of the continental platform. La Guaira Bank is located close to the Carayaca Bank, another structure that rises between 50 and 100 m from the surface.

See also
Placer (geography)
Battle of La Guaira (1812)

References

Undersea banks of the Caribbean Sea
Reefs of Venezuela
La Guaira